The Uninvited Guest may refer to:

 The Uninvited Guest (1923 film), a British silent drama film directed by George Dewhurst 
 The Uninvited Guest (1924 film), an American drama film directed by Ralph Ince
 The Uninvited Guest (1925 film), a 1925 Austrian silent film
 The Uninvited Guest (2004 film), a Spanish mystery thriller directed by Guillem Morales
The Uninvited Guest (play), a 1953 play by Mary Hayley Bell
 "The Uninvited Guest" (song), a 1989 song by Marillion
 "The Uninvited Guest", a track from Mercyful Fate's 1996 album Into the Unknown
 The Uninvited Guest, a 1906 painting by English artist Eleanor Fortescue-Brickdale

See also 
 Uninvited Guests, a 1970 episode of the British television series Dad's Army
Uninvited Guest, a 1999 American thriller film
The Uninvited Guests (2012), the third novel by British writer Sadie Jones